Orcadia is a monotypic genus of planktonic foraminifera belonging to the order Globigerinida. The phylogenetic position of this genus remains enigmatic; it was originally assigned to the family Hastigerinidae, but was later moved to Globigerinellidae.

Description
Orcadia includes species characterized by a low trochospiral and thin test; an interiomarginal, extraumbilical to umbilical aperture with a rounded lip; and triangular spines located in the distal areas of the test chambers.

References

Globothalamea
Taxa described in 1982